Sanctus Lino Wanok was born 7 April 1957 at Ukuru Pamach Village, Zombo District, in the West Nile sub-region, in the Northern Region of Uganda. He became the Bishop of the Roman Catholic Diocese of Lira on 9 February 2019.

Priesthood
He was ordained a deacon on 31 August 1986 at Edofe Roman Catholic Cathedral, Arua. He was ordained priest on 27 September 1986 at Arua by Bishop Frederick Drandua. He earned a degree in canon law from the Pontifical Urban University in Rome. He was appointed bishop of the Diocese of Nebbi on 8 February 2011, by Pope Benedict XVI and ordained bishop on 30 April 2011 at Nebbi.

He was appointed Bishop of the Diocese of Lira on 23 November 2018 by Pope Francis and installed as the fourth Bishop of Lira on 9 February 2019 at Lira, succeeding Bishop Giuseppe Franzelli, who had reached the mandatory retirement age of 75 years.

See also
 Uganda Martyrs
 Roman Catholicism in Uganda

References

External links
About The Right Reverend Sanctus Lino Wanok

1957 births
Living people
20th-century Roman Catholic bishops in Uganda
21st-century Roman Catholic bishops in Uganda
People from Zombo District
Roman Catholic bishops of Nebbi
Roman Catholic bishops of Lira